The 1990 Blockbuster Bowl was an American college football bowl game between the Penn State Nittany Lions and the Florida State Seminoles.

Background
The Nittany Lions lost their first two games of the season before going on a nine-game winning streak. Florida State won their first four games, lost two straight, and then won five straight.

Game summary
On their first drive, the Seminoles scored on a Richie Andrews 41 yard field goal. Penn State could not respond, Florida State benefited off a 39-yard punt return that culminated with an Amp Lee touchdown. Tony Sacca threw a touchdown to David Daniels to put the Nittany Lions on the board with 1:13 remaining in the first quarter. Amp Lee ran for his second touchdown of the game early into the second quarter, giving the Seminoles a ten-point lead, which they retained up until the third quarter. In that quarter, Craig Fayak narrowed the lead on a 32-yard field goal. In response, Casey Weldon scored on a touchdown run to make the score 24–10. Penn State narrowed the lead to seven on a Terry Smith touchdown catch from Tom Bill. The Nittany Lions had one final chance to tie the game after getting into the Seminoles' red zone. With three minutes remaining, Seminole John Davis intercepted a pass near the end zone, as the Seminoles soon ran the clock out, winning the first annual Blockbuster Bowl. Amp Lee was named MVP of the game after rushing for 86 yards on 21 attempts for two touchdowns, while also catching 5 passes for 32 yards. Florida State dominated the possession of the game, having it for 33:47, opposed to Penn State's 26:13.

Aftermath
The Seminoles would return to the bowl in 2008 and 2011. Penn State would return in 1993.

Statistics

References

Cheez-It Bowl
Russell Athletic Bowl
Penn State Nittany Lions football bowl games
Florida State Seminoles football bowl games
December 1990 sports events in the United States
1990 in sports in Florida
Sports competitions in Miami Gardens, Florida